Valentin Stocker (born 12 April 1989) is a Swiss former professional footballer who played as a left midfielder, He also can play as attacking midfielder. He has played for the Switzerland national team.

Club career

Basel 
Born in Lucerne, Stocker began his youth career with SC Kriens, playing there between 1996 and December 2005. As of January 2006 he transferred to Basel and played for their Under-21 team in the Swiss 1. Liga. He was called into the first team squad during the 2007–08 season after becoming one of the best midfielders in the reserve squad. He signed his first professional contract on his 18th birthday.

Stocker made his first team debut for FC Basel in the Swiss Cup semi-final tie at home to FC Thun at St. Jakob Park on 27 February 2008 as Basel won 1–0. He played his League debut on 2 March 2008 in the 3–1 away win also against Thun. In his third league game, on 16 March, he scored his first Super League goal against FC Sion, but he could not hinder the 4–2 away defeat. At the end of the 2007–08 Swiss Super League season and after the Swiss Cup Final, on 6 April, FC Basel won the national Double. In the league Stocker played eleven games, scoring three goals. In the last game of the season he and Marco Streller scored the two goals in Basel's 2–0 home win over BSC Young Boys and they won the championship by four points.

During the 2008–09 Swiss Super League season Stocker played 32 games, scoring five goals, but Basel finished just third in the League table, qualifying for the Europa League. In the 2009–10 season Stocker played 31 League games, scoring 12 goals, and Basel again won the Double. In the Cup Final Stocker scored two goals as Basel won 6–0 against FC Lausanne-Sport.

In the 2010–11 season Stocker played 26 League games, marking seven goals, and he won his third championship medal with the club. But Stocker injured himself on 23 April in the game against BSC Young Boys. This was his 100th Super League match. The injury was a cruciate ligament rupture and was operated two days later. His recovery times was estimated at six to seven months.

In the 2011–12 season he returned into the team on 3 December 2011 during the 1–0 home victory against FC Luzern and on the same day it was announced that his contract had been extended until the end of June 2016. He was substituted in during the group stage of the 2011–12 UEFA Champions League 2–1 home win against Manchester United, as Basel qualified for the Knockout phase, sending United out of the competition. During the first leg match in the Round of 16 on 22 February 2012 against Bayern Munich he was substituted in and scored the winning goal. At the end of the 2011–12 Swiss Super League season Stocker won his fourth League Championship title with Basel,  the third in a row. this was also his third Double because Basel also won the Swiss Cup

During the 2012–13 season Stocker had another highlight in his football career. Due to an injury Marco Streller and due an illness Alexander Frei were both unable to play the Europa League knockout phase match against Dnipro Dnipropetrovsk on 21 February 2013. Therefore, Stocker was nominated as team captain for the very first time and he led the Basel team to a 1–1 away draw and they qualified for the round of 16. At the end of the Swiss Super League season 2012–13 Stocker won his fifth Championship title (fourth in a row) and won the Swiss Cup runner-up silver medal. In the 2012–13 UEFA Europa League Basel advanced as far as the semi-finals, there being matched against the reigning UEFA Champions League holders Chelsea, but were knocked out being beaten 2–5 on aggregate.

Basel's 2013–14 Super League season was very successful. Stocker won his sixth league championship title with Basel. They also reached the final of the 2013–14 Swiss Cup, but were beaten 2–0 by Zürich after extra time. During the 2013–14 Champions League season Basel reached the group stage and finished the group in third position. Thus they qualified for Europa League knockout phase and here they advanced as far as the quarter-finals. In their season 2013–14 Basel played a total of 68 matches (36 Swiss League fixtures, 6 Swiss Cup, 6 Champions League and 10 Europa League and 10 test matches). Stocker totaled 55 appearances, 30 League, 4 Cup, 10 Champions League and 5 Europa League as well 6 in the test games. He scored a total of 19 goals and gave 14 assists in these matches.

Hertha BSC 
On 18 May 2014, Hertha BSC officially announced the signing of Stocker. Stocker reportedly received a four-year contract after Hertha and FC Basel agreed on a transfer fee of around €5 million.

Return to Basel 
On 10 January 2018, FC Basel announced that Stocker would return to the club, signing a three and a half year contract dated up until June 2021.

Under trainer Marcel Koller Basel won the Swiss Cup in the 2018–19 season. In the first round Basel beat FC Montlingen 3–0, in the second round Echallens Région 7–2 and in the round of 16 Winterthur 1–0. In the quarter finals Sion were defeated 4–2 after extra time and in the semi finals Zürich were defeated 3–1. All these games were played away from home. The final was held on the 19 May 2019 in the Stade de Suisse Wankdorf Bern against Thun. Striker Albian Ajeti scored the first goal, Fabian Frei the second for Basel, then Dejan Sorgić netted a goal for Thun, but the end result was 2–1 for Basel. Stocker played in five cup games and scored the two goals, these both being during the extra time in the match against Sion.

On 17 May 2022, Basel announced that Stocker would retire from playing at the end of the 2021–22 season and will remain at the club as an assistant to the sporting director. Five days later, on 22 May, Stocker was substituted in to play the final 14 Minutes of his last professional game.

During his time with the club Stocker won the Swiss championship six times and the Swiss Cup four times. Between the years 2007 and 2014 and again from 2018 to 2022 he played a total of 515 games for Basel scoring a total of 116 goals. 286 of these games were in the Swiss Super League, 33 in the Swiss Cup, 57 in the UEFA competitions (Champions League, Europa League and Conference League and 99 were friendly games. He scored 74 goal in the domestic league, 9 in the Cup and 18 in the European competitions, the other 15 were scored during the test games. In terms of the number of competitive games, which is 416, he is one of the top five in the club's history, and in terms of goals scored - although not a striker - he is 12th position in the historic FCB rankings.

International career 
Stocker has played international football at various age levels, including Swiss U19 and Swiss U21. He made his debut for the Switzerland U16 team on 25 April 2005, being substituted in, in the 2–0 away defeat against Scotland U16. In 2008 and 2009 he played 7 games for the Switzerland U21 team. His debut for the U21 was on 26 March 2008 in the UEFA European Under-21 Football Championship qualification Group 5 2–1 away defeat against Macedonia Under-21.

He made his debut for Switzerland in Ottmar Hitzfeld's first match as manager, on 20 August 2008 against Cyprus at Stade de Genève. He scored the opening goal of the 4–1 friendly win.

Stocker was included in Switzerland's squad for the 2014 FIFA World Cup, making one appearance, starting in the opening match against Ecuador before being substituted out at halftime.

Career statistics

Club

International goals 
Scores and results list Switzerland's goal tally first, score column indicates score after each Stocker goal.

Honours and titles

Club 
Basel
 Swiss Super League (6): 2007–08, 2009–10, 2010–11, 2011–12, 2012–13, 2013–14
 Swiss Cup (4): 2007–08, 2009–10, 2011–12, 2018–19
 Swiss Cup runner up (2): 2012–13, 2013–14
 Uhren Cup (2): 2008, 2013
 Swiss Champion U-18: 2006
 Swiss Cup U-19: 2006

Individual 
Swiss Youngster of the Year: 2008–09

References

External links 

 Profile at FC Basel 
 
 

1989 births
Living people
Sportspeople from Lucerne
Association football midfielders
Swiss men's footballers
Switzerland youth international footballers
Switzerland international footballers
Swiss expatriate footballers
SC Kriens players
FC Basel players
Hertha BSC players
Swiss Super League players
Bundesliga players
Expatriate footballers in Germany
2014 FIFA World Cup players
Swiss expatriate sportspeople in Germany